Iason Kyrkos (born 21 March 2003) is a Greek professional footballer who plays as an attacking midfielder for Super League club PAS Giannina.

References

2003 births
Living people
Greek footballers
Super League Greece players
PAS Giannina F.C. players
Association football midfielders
Footballers from Ioannina